Idea Vilariño Romani (Montevideo, 18 August 1920 – 28 April 2009) was a Uruguayan poet, essayist and literary critic.

She belonged to the group of intellectuals known as "Generación del 45." In this generation, there are several writers such as Juan Carlos Onetti, Mario Benedetti, Sarandy Cabrera, Carlos Martínez Moreno, Ángel Rama, Carlos Real de Azúa, Carlos Maggi, Alfredo Gravina, Mario Arregui, Amanda Berenguer, Humberto Megget, Emir Rodríguez Monegal, Gladys Castelvecchi and José Pedro Díaz among others.

She also worked as a translator, composer and lecturer.

Biography 
She was born to an educated, middle-class family where music and literature were always present. Her father, Leandro Vilariño (1892-1944), was a poet whose works were not published in his lifetime. Just like her siblings, Numen, Poema, Azul, and Alma, she studied music. Her mother was very well educated in European literature.

She was a professor of literature and secondary education from 1952 until The Coup of 1973. After the restoration of the democratic system, she returned to education, working as a professor in the department of Uruguayan and Latin-American literature in the College of Education of Humanities and Sciences of The University of the Republic.

She started writing at a very young age, and her first mature poems were written between 17 and 21 years old. Her first poetic work, La suplicante, was published in 1945. In the subsequent years, she would become recognized internationally and awarded with various awards. Her poems were marked by an intimate experience, intense and distressing, but always very coherent.

Idea was included in the group of writers known as the Generación del 45  who became prominent between 1945 and 1950. Among the Generación del 45 the following authors can be found: Juan Carlos Onetti, with whom she had a love affair, Mario Benedetti, Sarandy Cabrera, Carlos Martínez Moreno, Ángel Rama, Carlos Real de Azúa, Carlos Maggi, Alfredo Gravina, Mario Arregui, Amanda Berenguer, Humberto Megget, Emir Rodríguez Monegal, Gladys Castelvecchi, José Pedro Díaz, and others.

She participated in numerous literary ventures.

Her translations also have been the object of recognition, with some of them, such as the more recognized works of Shakespeare, being performed in the theaters of Montevideo.

The documentary was directed by Mario Jacob and premiered in May 1998.

Her work has been translated to various languages, including Italian, German, and Portuguese.

As a composer, four emblematic songs can be mentioned that are pertinent to popular Uruguayan music: A una paloma (performed by Daniel Viglietti), La canción y el poema (performed by Alfredo Zitarrosa), Los orientales, and Ya me voy pa' la guerrilla (performed by Los Olimareños).

In 2004, she received the Premio Konex (Konex prize) MERCOSUR a las Letras, granted by the Konex Foundation (Argentina), as the most influential writer of the region.

Later, she had to undergo surgery that left her with an intestinal and arterial occlusion. She did not recover, and died in Montevideo on 28 April 2009.

Works

Poetry 
 La suplicante (1945).
 Cielo Cielo (1947).
 Paraíso perdido (Número. 1949).
 Por aire sucio (Número. 1950).
 Nocturnos (1955).
 Poemas de amor (1957).
 Pobre Mundo (1966).
 Poesía (1970).
 No (1980).
 Canciones (1993).
 Poesía 1945 - 1990 (1994).
 Poesía completa (Montevideo. Cal y Canto. 2000).

Essays 
 Grupos simétricos en la poesía de Antonio Machado (1951).
 La rima en Herrera y Reissig (1955).
 Grupos simétricos en poesía (1958).
 Las letras de tango (1965).
 El tango cantado (1981).

Translations 
 Raymond Queneau: El rapto de Ícaro, Buenos Aires, Losada, 19737
 Jacques C. Alexis: Romancero de las estrellas, Montevideo, Arca, 19738
 William Shakespeare: Hamlet, príncipe de Dinamarca, Montevideo, Ediciones de la Banda Oriental, 1974.9
 Andrew Cecil Bradley: Macbeth, la atmósfera, las brujas, Montevideo, Editorial Técnica, 1976.9
 William Shakespeare: Macbeth, Montevideo, Editorial Técnica, 1977.9
 Guillermo Enrique Hudson: La tierra purpúrea, Caracas, Biblioteca Ayacucho, 1980 (traducida junto con Jaime Rest).10
 Guillermo Enrique Hudson: Allá lejos y hace tiempo, Caracas, Biblioteca Ayacucho, 1980 (traducida junto con Jaime Rest).10
 Christine Laurent: Transatlántico (Adaptación de André Tachiné y Philippe Arnaud. Traducción del francés de Idea Vilariño). Montevideo, Trilce, 1996.9

References

Bibliography 
 Idea: La vida escrita (libro álbum. Contiene entrevistas, fragmentos de su diario íntimo y cartas. Montevideo, Cal y Canto y Academia Nacional de Letras, 2007, .

External links
 
 Biography of Idea Vilariño 
 A media voz 
 

1920 births
2009 deaths
Writers from Montevideo
Uruguayan people of Galician descent
Academic staff of the University of the Republic (Uruguay)
Uruguayan women poets
Uruguayan literary critics
Uruguayan women essayists
Uruguayan translators
Uruguayan composers
Uruguayan educators
Women literary critics
English–Spanish translators
20th-century Uruguayan poets
20th-century translators
20th-century essayists
20th-century Uruguayan women writers
Premio Bartolomé Hidalgo